This is an alphabetical list of articles pertaining specifically to aerospace engineering. For a broad overview of engineering, see List of engineering topics. For biographies, see List of engineers.

A
Ablative laser propulsion —
Absolute value —
Acceleration —
Action —
Advanced Space Vision System —
Aeroacoustics —
Aerobrake —
Aerobraking —
Aerocapture —
Aerodynamics —
Aeroelasticity —
Aeronautical abbreviations —
Aeronautics —
Aerospace engineering —
Aerospike engine —
Aerostat —
Aft-crossing trajectory —
Aileron —
Air-augmented rocket —
Aircraft —
Aircraft flight control systems —
Aircraft flight mechanics —
Airfoil —
Airlock —
Airship —
Alcubierre drive —
Angle of attack —
Angular momentum —
Angular velocity —
Antimatter rocket —
Apsis —
Arcjet rocket —
Areal velocity —
ARP4761 —
Aspect ratio (wing) —
Astrodynamics —
Atmospheric reentry —
Attitude control —
Avionics —

B
Balloon —
Ballute —
Beam-powered propulsion —
Bernoulli's equation —
Bi-elliptic transfer —
Big dumb booster —
Bipropellant rocket —
Bleed air —
Booster rocket —
Breakthrough Propulsion Physics Program —
Buoyancy —
Bussard ramjet —

C
Canard —
Centennial challenges —
Center of gravity —
Center of mass —
Center of pressure —
Chord —
Collimated light —
Compressibility —
Computational fluid dynamics —
Computing —
Control engineering —
Conservation of momentum —
Crew Exploration Vehicle —
Critical mach —
Centrifugal compressor —
Chevron nozzle —

D
De Laval nozzle —
Deflection —
Delta-v —
Delta-v budget —
Density —
Derivative —
Digital Datcom —
Displacement (vector) —
DO-178B —
DO-254 —
Drag (physics) —
Drag coefficient —
Drag equation —
Dual mode propulsion rocket —
Delta wing —

E
Earth's atmosphere —
Electrostatic ion thruster —
Elliptic partial differential equation —
Energy —
Engineering —
Engineering economics —
Enstrophy —
Equation of motion —
Euler angles —
European Space Agency —
Expander cycle (rocket) —

F
Field Emission Electric Propulsion —
Fixed-wing aircraft —
Flight control surfaces —
Flight control system (aircraft) —
Flight control system (helicopter) —
Flight dynamics —
Floatstick —
Fluid —
Fluid dynamics —
Fluid mechanics —
Fluid statics —
Force —
Freefall —
Fuselage —
Future Air Navigation System —
Flying wing —

G
Gas-generator cycle (rocket) —
Geostationary orbit —
Geosynchronous orbit —
Glide ratio —
GPS —
Gravitational constant —
Gravitational slingshot —
Gravity —
Gravity turn —
Guidance, navigation and control —
Guidance system —

H
Hall-effect thruster —
Heat shield —
Helicopter —
Hohmann transfer orbit —
Hybrid rocket —
Hydrodynamics —
Hydrostatics —
Hyperbolic partial differential equation —
Hypersonic —
HyShot —

I
Impulse —
Inertial navigation system —
Instrument landing system —
Integral —
Internal combustion —
Interplanetary Transport Network —
Interplanetary travel —
Interstellar travel —
Ion thruster —
ISRO

J
Jet engine —

K
Kepler's laws of planetary motion —
Kessler syndrome —
Kestrel rocket engine —
Kinetic energy —
Kite —
Kutta condition —
Kutta–Joukowski theorem —

L
Landing —
Landing gear —
Lagrangian —
Lagrangian point —
Laser broom —
Laser Camera System —
Latus rectum —
Launch window —
Law of universal gravitation —
Leading edge —
Lift —
Lift coefficient —
Lightcraft —
Lighter than air —
Liquid air cycle engine —
Liquid fuels —
Liquid rocket propellants —
Lithobraking —
Loiter —
Low Earth orbit —
Lunar space elevator —

M
Mach number —
Magnetic sail —
Magnetoplasmadynamic thruster —
Mass —
Mass driver —
Mechanics of fluids —
Membrane mirror —
Metre per second —
Microwave landing system —
Mini-magnetospheric plasma propulsion —
Missile guidance —
Moment of inertia —
Momentum —
Momentum wheel —
Monopropellant rocket —
Motion —
Multistage rocket —

N
Nanotechnology —
NASA —
Navier–Stokes equations —
Newton (unit) —
Newton's laws of motion —
Nose cone design —
Nozzle —

O
Orbit —
Orbit phasing —
Orbiter Boom Sensor System —
Orbital elements —
Orbital inclination change —
Orbital maneuver —
Orbital node —
Orbital period —
Orbital stationkeeping —
Osculating orbit —

P
Parallel axes rule —
Parasitic drag —
Parawing —
Perpendicular axes rule —
Physics —
Planetary orbit —
Plasma (physics) —
Plug nozzle —
Pogo oscillation —
Prandtl-Glauert singularity —
Precession —
Pressure —
Pressure altitude —
Pressure-fed engine —
Propeller —
Proper orbital elements —
Pulsed inductive thruster —
Pulsed plasma thruster —
Propulsion —
Philippine Space Agency —

Q

R
Radar —
Railgun —
Ram accelerator —
Ramjet —
Reaction control system —
Reentry —
Reflection —
Relativistic rocket —
Remote Manipulator System —
Resistojet rocket —
Reusable launch system —
Reynolds number —
RL-10 (rocket engine) —
Rocket —
Rocket engine nozzle —
Rocket fuel —
Rocket launch —
Rudder —

S
SABRE —
Satellite —
Saturn (rocket family) —
Scalar (physics) —
Schlieren —
Schlieren photography —
Scramjet —
Second moment of area —
Shock wave —
SI —
Single-stage to orbit —
Skyhook (structure) —
Stream function —
Streamline —
Solar panel —
Solar sail —
Solar thermal rocket —
Solid of revolution —
Solid rocket —
Sound barrier —
Space activity suit —
Space elevator —
Space fountain —
Space plane —
Space Shuttle —
Space Shuttle external tank —
Space Shuttle Main Engine —
Space station —
Space suit —
Space technology —
Space transport —
Spacecraft —
Spacecraft design —
Spacecraft propulsion —
Special relativity —
Specific impulse —
Speed of sound —
Staged combustion cycle (rocket) —
Subsonic —
Supersonic —
Surface of revolution —
Sweep theory —

T
Tait–Bryan rotations —
Temperature —
Terminal velocity —
Test target —
Tether propulsion —
Thermal protection system —
Thermodynamics —
Thrust —
Thrust vector control —
Thruster —
Torricelli's equation —
Trajectory —
Trailing edge —
Trans Lunar Injection —
Transonic —
Transverse wave —
Tripropellant rocket —
Tsiolkovsky rocket equation —
Turbomachinery —
Two-stage-to-orbit —

U
UFO
UAV

V
V-2 rocket —
Variable specific impulse magnetoplasma rocket —
Velocity —
Viscometer —
Viscosity —
Vortex generator —

W
Wave drag —
Weight —
Weight function —
Wind tunnel —
Wing —
Wright Flyer —
Wright Glider of 1902 —

X

Y

Z

Aerospace engineering topics